Masaru Masuda  is a former taijiquan athlete from Japan. He won gold medals at the 1993 East Asian Games and the 1994 Asian Games, being the first Japanese wushu athlete to do so at each respective multi-sport event. He also won a silver medal in taijiquan at the 1993 World Wushu Championships in Kuala Lumpur, Malaysia. Since his competitive career, he assumed a position at Waseda University and has published works on taijiquan.

See also 

 List of Asian Games medalists in wushu

References 

Living people
Japanese wushu practitioners
Wushu practitioners at the 1990 Asian Games
Wushu practitioners at the 1994 Asian Games
Asian Games medalists in wushu
Asian Games gold medalists for Japan
Medalists at the 1994 Asian Games
Year of birth missing (living people)